Dob pri Šentvidu ( or ) is a village in the Municipality of Ivančna Gorica in central Slovenia. It lies east of Ivančna Gorica and the A2 motorway runs across the settlement territory to the south of the village core. The area is part of the historical region of Lower Carniola. The municipality is now included in the Central Slovenia Statistical Region.

Name
The name of the settlement was changed from Dob to Dob pri Šentvidu in 1953.

Church

The local church is dedicated to Saint Peter and belongs to the Parish of Šentvid pri Stični. It was built in the 17th century.

References

External links

Dob pri Šentvidu on Geopedia

Populated places in the Municipality of Ivančna Gorica